The HWA Tag Team Championship is the tag team titles contested for in the Heartland Wrestling Association.  It was established in 1996 when the Head Bangers (Mosh and Thrasher) became the first champions.

Title history
Key

See also
Heartland Wrestling Association

References

External links
 
 

Heartland Wrestling Association championships
Tag team wrestling championships